Michael (March 17, 1973, Cameroon – April 19, 2000) was the first male 'talking' gorilla.  He had a working vocabulary of over 600 signs in American Sign Language, taught to him by Koko, a female gorilla; Dr. Francine Patterson (to whom the gorillas referred using the sign "penny"); and other staff of Stanford University.  Michael, an orphan, spent most of his life in Woodside, California, where he became a local celebrity and painter, creating vividly colourful abstract works.

Biography

Michael's parents were killed while he was still a baby.  According to the movie Koko: Conversation with a Gorilla, his handlers felt that using sign language, he was attempting to relate his mother's death at the hands of poachers.  At the age of three, he was brought to live with Koko at Stanford.

Michael's favorite color was yellow, and his favorite television shows were Sesame Street and Mister Rogers.  He enjoyed listening to Luciano Pavarotti and looking at pictures. Michael also greatly enjoyed painting, and took it quite seriously, as opposed to Koko, who would paint for fun.

Use of language
Michael had a vocabulary of over 600 signs, some of which he learned from Koko. They both used 'stink' for 'flowers', and 'lip' for 'girl'. Because of the musculo-skeletal difference between apes and humans, the two gorillas employed a modified version of American Sign Language signs, adapted for their physical abilities.

In sign language, deaf humans often create new signs by combining two or more signs, to express a concept for which they have no sign.  Additionally, repetition and exaggeration of signs is used to create emphasis. Repetition, exaggeration and the creation of new signs by combining signs are techniques which are also used by simian 'signers'.

Michael learned 20 words within his first year with The Gorilla Foundation. The following is an example of Michael's description of an event that is thought by humans at The Gorilla Foundation to be the death of his mother—killed by bushmeat poachers when he was quite young:
"Squash meat gorilla.  Mouth tooth.  Cry sharp-noise loud.  Bad think-trouble look-face.  Cut/neck lip (girl) hole."
 
Michael seemed to behave akin to a small child. Michael described emotion, memories, and lies through sign language. Both Michael and Koko used the sign "fake" to describe a lie or to express doubt about the truth of a statement.

Death
Michael died of heart failure related to cardiomyopathy on April 19, 2000. Koko and her more recent potential mate, Ndume, mourned his passing for several months.

Koko died in 2018, and staff have since returned Ndume to the Cincinnati Zoo, where he lives with two female gorilla companions.

See also
 Chantek
 Dian Fossey
 George Schaller
 Great ape language
 Jane Goodall
 Kanzi
 List of individual apes
 Mountain gorilla
 Primate
 Primate use of American Sign Language
 The Mind of an Ape

References

1973 animal births
2000 animal deaths
Apes from language studies
Individual gorillas
Individual primates in the United States
Animal artists